Gasullia is a genus of gastropods belonging to the family Trissexodontidae.

The species of this genus are found in Spain.

Species:

Gasullia cobosi 
Gasullia zapateri

References

Gastropods